Sinan Ayrancı (born 9 July 1990 in Sweden, Stockholm) is a Turkish-Swedish footballer currently playing for FK Bosna 08 in the Swedish amateur division. He previously played for Hammarby Fotboll and IF Brommapojkarna in Sweden and Gençlerbirliği in the Turkcell Super League.

He played for the Sweden national under-19 football team during 2009.

References

External links

1990 births
Living people
Swedish footballers
Turkish footballers
IF Brommapojkarna players
Gençlerbirliği S.K. footballers
Hammarby Fotboll players
Sweden youth international footballers
Footballers from Stockholm
Swedish people of Turkish descent
Association football forwards